|}

The Prix Herod is a Listed flat horse race in France open to two-year-old thoroughbreds. It is run at Chantilly over a distance of 1,400 metres (about 7 furlongs), and it is scheduled to take place each year in November.

History
The event was established in 1930, and it was originally held at Le Tremblay. It was initially the first leg of a two-part series called the Prix Biennal Herod-Matchem. The second leg, for three-year-olds, was the Prix Matchem. The two parts were named after Herod and Matchem, foundation sires in the 18th century.

The early editions of the Prix Herod were contested over 1,400 metres. It was transferred to Évry in 1973, and from this point its distance was 1,600 metres.

The race was run at Saint-Cloud over 1,500 metres in 1997. For a period thereafter it was staged at Maisons-Laffitte over 1,400 metres. It was switched to Deauville in 2002, and shortened to 1,300 metres in 2004.

The Prix Herod moved to Longchamp and reverted to 1,400 metres in 2005. It was transferred to Chantilly in 2012. Prior to 2015 it took place in October.

Records
Leading jockey since 1979 (3 wins):
 Dominique Boeuf – Groom Dancer (1986), Triteamtri (1987), Vitaba (1995)
 Gérald Mossé – Assombrie (1990), Mendocino (1991), Daylami (1996)
 Olivier Peslier – Berkoutchi (1998), Stoneside (2006), Saying (2009)
 Christophe Soumillon – Grand Vadla (2005), Sceptre Rouge (2007), Temps au Temps (2010)
 Thierry Thulliez – Innit (2000), Vaniloquio (2011), Red Onion (2016)

Leading trainer since 1979 (5 wins):
 François Boutin – Gilgit (1980), Flying Sauce (1982), Assombrie (1990), Mendocino (1991), Vitellozzi (1994)
 Robert Collet – Berkeley Court (1983), Captive Island (1984), Flying Trio (1985), Albacora (1997), Radhwa (1999)

Leading owner since 1979 (3 wins): (includes part ownership)
 HH Aga Khan IV – Daylami (1996), Grand Vadla (2005), Sceptre Rouge (2007)
 Gérard Augustin-Normand – Vaniloquio (2011), La Hoguette (2013), La Cressonniere (2015)

Winners since 1979

Earlier winners

 1930: Pearl Cap
 1931: Laeken
 1932: Rodosto
 1933: Astronomer
 1934: The Nile
 1935: Gong
 1936: En Fraude
 1937: Trissino
 1938: Billy of Spain
 1949: Fontaine
 1956: Denisy
 1957: Hermance
 1959: Wordpam
 1960: Ploermel
 1962: Partisane
 1966: Tiepolo
 1969: Without Fear
 1970: Irish Ball
 1971: Lyphard
 1972: Robertino
 1973: Kamaraan
 1974: Karad
 1976: Conglomerat
 1977: Jik

See also
 List of French flat horse races

References

 France Galop / Racing Post:
 

 pedigreequery.com – Prix Herod.

Flat horse races for two-year-olds
Chantilly Racecourse
Horse races in France
Recurring sporting events established in 1930